A paradigm, in science and epistemology, is a distinct concept or thought pattern

Paradigm may also refer to:

Science and medicine
 Paradigm, an experimental setup
 Programming paradigm, a style of programming, usually enforced by the programming language used
 Minimed Paradigm, an insulin pump made by Minimed/Medtronic
 Linguistic paradigm, the complete set of inflectional forms of a word.
 Algorithmic paradigm, a common generic method which underlies the designs of a class of algorithms

Books and publishing
Paradigm (comics), a character in the Marvel Comics 
Paradigm (Image Comics), an independent comic book series
Paradigm (publisher), a Japanese publishing company
 Paradigm Publishing, the post-secondary division of EMC Publishing, LLC

Other uses
Paradigm Concepts, a small-press role-playing game publishing company
Paradigm Entertainment, a video game studio
Paradigm High School, a high school in South Jordan, Utah
 Paradigm Secure Communications, provider of  satellite communications to the UK Ministry of Defence
Paradigm Talent Agency, a talent and literary agency headquartered in Beverly Hills, CA
Paradigm City, the setting of the anime series Big O
V-STOL Pairadigm, an American aircraft design (intentional misspelling)
Paradigm (video game), a point-and-click adventure video game
"Paradigm", a song by Northlane from the 2019 album Alien

See also
Paradigm shift, a change in the basic assumptions of science
 Paradigm Shift (disambiguation)
 Paradigmatic analysis, in semiotics the analysis of paradigms embedded in a text